IK Sirius is a Swedish sports club located in Uppsala

It includes the following departments:
 IK Sirius - bandy department 
 IK Sirius Fotboll - football department 
 IK Sirius Innebandy - floorball department 

Sirius, IK
Sirius IK sections
Multi-sport clubs in Sweden